Akpınar is a village in the Hozat District, Tunceli Province, Turkey. The village is populated by Kurds of the Ferhadan tribe and had a population of 75 in 2021.

The hamlets of Kuşaklı and Kuzuluk are attached to the village. The two hamlets are populated by Kurds of the Karabal tribe.

References 

Kurdish settlements in Tunceli Province
Villages in Hozat District